Ferenc Miákits (7 April 1876 – 17 May 1924) was a Hungarian politician, who served as Minister of Finance in 1919. He was one of the leaders of the MSZDP. In the Károly Huszár administration he served as state secretary of the Ministry of Trade for a short time. In 1922 he became a member of the Diet of Hungary.

References
 Magyar Életrajzi Lexikon

1876 births
1924 deaths
People from Érd
Finance ministers of Hungary